Aubrieta libanotica, common name Lebanese rock cress, is a species of flowering plant in the mustard family Brassicaceae. The genus is named after Claude Aubriet, a French flower painter.  A. Libanotica is native to the mountainous ranges of Lebanon and some parts of Syria.

Description 
It is a low, spreading plant, hardy, evergreen and perennial, with small violet, flowers, and inhabits rocks and banks. It prefers light, well-drained soil, is tolerant of a wide pH range, and can grow in partial shade or full sun.

Etymology 
The genus is named after Claude Aubriet, a French flower painter. The specific epithet refers the Lebanon mountain range where the species was first described by the Swiss botanist Pierre Edmond Boissier.

Distribution and habitat 
A. Libanotica is endemic to elevated mountains of Lebanon.

Diseases and pests 
A. Libanotica is susceptible to Ceutorhynchus minutus a true weevil in the tribe Ceutorhynchini.

References 

Flora of Lebanon
Brassicaceae
Taxa named by Pierre Edmond Boissier
Taxa named by Rudolph Friedrich Hohenacker